Bart Selman is a Dutch-American professor of computer science at Cornell University. He has previously worked at AT&T Bell Laboratories. He is also co-founder and principal investigator of the Center for Human-Compatible Artificial Intelligence (CHAI) at the University of California, Berkeley, led by Berkeley artificial intelligence (AI) expert Stuart J. Russell, and co-chair of the Computing Community Consortium's 20-year roadmap for AI research.

Education and career 
Selman attended the Technical University of Delft, from where he received a master's degree in physics, graduating in 1983. He received his master's and PhD in computer science from the University of Toronto in 1985 and 1991 respectively.

Research 
Selman's research focuses on the increasing and changing role of machines and computing in society. His studies at Center for Human-Compatible AI (CHAI) focus on the potential risks and negative impacts of advanced AI. An expert in AI Safety, he studies how computing has shifted from ethics-neutral software to predictive algorithms and advocates integrating ethics and AI.

He has authored over 90 publications, which have appeared in journals including Nature, Science, and Proceedings of the National Academy of Sciences. He has presented at several conferences in the fields of artificial intelligence and computer science.

His research concepts include tractable inference, knowledge representation, stochastic search methods, theory approximation, knowledge compilation, planning, default reasoning, satisfiability solvers like WalkSAT, and connections between computer science and statistical physics, namely phase transition phenomena.

Honors and awards 
Selman has received five Best Paper Awards for his work, including the Cornell Stephen Miles Excellence in Teaching Award, the Cornell Outstanding Educator Award, a National Science Foundation Career Award, and an Alfred P. Sloan Research Fellowship. He is a Fellow of the American Association for Artificial Intelligence, the American Association for the Advancement of Science, and the Association for Computing Machinery. He sits on the advisory board for the DARPA Grand Challenge Cornell Team.

Partial list of Selman's papers 
 Statistical Regimes Across Considerateness Regions, Carla P. Gomes, Cesar Fernandez, Bart Selman, and Christian Bessiere. Proc. 10th Intl. Conf. on Principles and Practice of Constraint Programming (CP-04), Toronto, Ont., 2004. Distinguished Paper Award.
 Towards Efficient Sampling: Exploiting Random Walk Strategies, Wei Wei, Jordan Erenrich, and Bart Selman. Proc. AAAI-04. San Jose, CA, 2004.
 Tracking evolving communities in large linked networks, John Hopcroft, Brian Kulis, Omar Khan, and Bart Selman. Proc. Natl. Acad. of Sci. (PNAS), Febr., 2004.
 Natural communities in large linked networks, John Hopcroft, Brian Kulis, Omar Khan, and Bart Selman. Proc. KDD, August 2003.
 Backdoor To Typical Case Complexity, Ryan Williams, Carla Gomes, and Bart Selman. Proc. IJCAI-03 Acapulco, Mexico, 2003.
 Communication and computation in distributed CSP algorithms, Cesar Fernandez, Ramon Bejar, Bhaskar Krishnamachari, Carla Gomes, and Bart Selman. In Distributed Sensor Networks, A Multi-agent Perspective. V. Lesser, C.L. Ortiz Jr., and M. Tambe (Eds.) Kluwer Academic Publishers, 2003.
 A principled study of the design tradeoffs for autonomous trading agents, Ioannis A. Vetsikas and Bart Selman. Second International Joint Conference on Autonomous Agents and Multi-Agent Systems, Melbourne, 2003. Describes Whitebear trading agent, winner of the Trading Agent competition 2002 (TAC-02).
 Satisfied with Physics, Gomes, Carla, and Selman, Bart. Science, Vol. 297, Aug. 2, 2002, 784–785. (Perspectives article.) Accompanying Mezard, Parisi, and Zecchina.
 Accelerating Random Walks, Wei, Wei and Selman, Bart. Proceedings of 8th Intl. Conference on the Principles and Practice of Constraint Programming (CP-2002), 2002.
 Dynamic Restart Policies, Kautz, Henry, Horvitz, Eric, Ruan, Yongshao, Gomes, Carla, and Selman, Bart. Proceedings of the Eighteenth National Conference on Artificial Intelligence (AAAI-02) Edmonton, Alberta, Canada, 2002, 674–682.

References

External links
Selman's website.
His current research projects.

Year of birth missing (living people)
Living people
American computer scientists
Cornell University faculty
Fellows of the Association for the Advancement of Artificial Intelligence
Artificial intelligence researchers
Fellows of the Association for Computing Machinery
Fellows of the American Association for the Advancement of Science
Scientists at Bell Labs
Dutch computer scientists
Delft University of Technology alumni
University of Toronto alumni
Sloan Research Fellows